Elachista deceptricula is a moth of the family Elachistidae. It is found in Spain, Ukraine, Greece and Turkey.

References

deceptricula
Moths described in 1880
Moths of Europe